Machynlleth power stations were two small electricity generating stations in Machynlleth Powys. They provided electricity to the town and the surrounding rural district from 1938 until the 1970s. The A station was a combined diesel & hydro-electric plant and the B station was a diesel engine plant.

History 
Machynlleth Electric Supply Company Limited (founded in 1932) proposed an electricity supply scheme for Machynlleth in 1938.  The company constructed a combined diesel engine and water-turbine electricity generating plant, later known as Machynlleth A. Upon the nationalisation of the British electricity supply industry in 1948 the Electric Supply Company was abolished and Machynlleth power station was vested in the British Electricity Authority (BEA). In 1956 the BEA’s successor the Central Electricity Authority (CEA) constructed the diesel-fired Machynlleth B, which was commissioned in September 1956. One of the diesel engines of the A station was transferred to the B station in 1956. The A power station was decommissioned in the 1960s, and the B station by 1978.

Plant and equipment

A station plant 
The plant at Machynlleth A power station comprised:

 1 × 110 horsepower (82 kW ) Francis water turbine
 1 × 35 horsepower (26 kW ) Francis water turbine
 1 × 100 horsepower (75 kW ) diesel engine
 1 × 200 horsepower (149 kW ) diesel engine
 1 × 400 horsepower (298  kW ) diesel engine

The turbines and engines drove a range of alternators:

 1 × 23 kW Brush alternator
 1 × 57 kW Brush alternator
 1 × 66 kW Brush alternator
 1 × 104 kW Brush alternator

The total generating capacity was 250 kW, 3-phase, 400 V AC.

B station plant 
The plant at Machynlleth B power station comprised:

 3 × 1,330 kW Mirlees 8-cylinder four-stroke supercharged diesel engines driving:
 3 × Brush 6.6 kV alternators
 1 × 268 kW Petters 4 cylinder two-stroke diesel engine with a Brush generator (transferred from the A station in 1956).

The total installed generating capacity of the B station was 4.258 MW.

Cooling water for the engines was drawn from the Afon Dulas.

Operations 
The operating conditions and electricity output of Machynlleth A power station were:  

The electricity 'sent out' data is the total output from both the hydro-electric and diesel plants. The proportions of diesel to hydro-electric generation was typically:

The operating conditions and electricity output of Machynlleth B power station were:

See also 

 Timeline of the UK electricity supply industry
 List of power stations in Wales
 Hydroelectricity in the United Kingdom

References 

Hydroelectric power stations in Wales
Demolished power stations in the United Kingdom